NGU may refer to:
 Non-gonococcal urethritis
 Nitroguanidine: a low explosive chemical
 ngu: ISO code of the Guerrero Nahuatl language

Persons
 ʻUelingatoni Ngū: a 19th-century Tongan Crown Prince
 Victor Anomah Ngu: a Cameroonian professor

Science
 Geological Survey of Norway (Norges geologiske undersøkelse in Norwegian)

Universities
 North Greenville University: a university in South Carolina, USA
 Nagoya Gakuin University: a private university located in Nagoya, Japan
 New Giza University: a private university in Giza, Egypt

Other
 National Guard of Ukraine